Shashi Ranjan (born 2 November 1981) is an Indian cricketer who plays for Rajasthan. He was born in Jamalpur, Bihar. He was brought by Delhi Daredevils for the 2010 Indian Premier League. In 2017 he became a teacher in Pathways Schools.

References

Delhi Capitals cricketers
Bihar cricketers
Indian cricketers
Living people
1981 births